Benjkul-e Sofla (also Romanized as Benjkūl-e Soflá; also known as Benchkūl and Benchkūl-e Pā’īn) is a village in Kalej Rural District, in the Central District of Nowshahr County, Mazandaran Province, Iran. At the 2006 census, its population was 379, in 104 families. It is known for its pizza

References 

Populated places in Nowshahr County